My Friend Steve was a band hailing from Orlando, Florida fronted by vocalist Steven Foxbury (aka Steve Burry). They have earned comparisons to Counting Crows. "Charmed" was their only single which charted, released on their 1998 album Hope & Wait on Mammoth Records. The single appeared on Billboard's Modern Rock Tracks and Adult Top 40 charts, peaking at numbers 38 and 30, respectively.

The music video for "Charmed" features actress Selma Blair, as the song was the theme for Zoe, Duncan, Jack and Jane in which she starred. That same year, the band released a live performance version of its song "All in All" on the charity album Live in the X Lounge II.

In 2001, the band released the song "Smash Baby" on the Axis Magazine compilation of that year.

The band consisted of Steven Burry on vocals, Eric Steinberg, Dave McMahon, Pat Koch, Richie Noble, and drummer Eric Gardner.

Albums

Hope & Wait
Released October 6, 1998.
 The Schooling
 Charmed
 Day Begun
 All in All
 Arnie
 Better Left Behind	
 Newest Superhero
 Lessening Mercies	
 Always the Way
 Backwards And Sideways
 Chandeliers	
 Carflips

Notes

External links
My Friend Steve on Yahoo! Music
My Friend Steve on ARTISTdirect.com

Rock music groups from Florida
Musical groups from Orlando, Florida